Lampang Hospital is the main hospital of Lampang Province, Thailand and is classified under the Ministry of Public Health as a regional hospital. It is the tertiary-care transfer hospital for patients in Phrae and Nan Provinces. It has a CPIRD Medical Education Center which trains doctors for the Faculty of Medicine of Chiang Mai University.

History 
Lampang Hospital was constructed in 1930 and had a major renovation according to the Fourth National Economic and Social Development Plan of 1977–1981, of which Lampang was one of 15 provincial hospitals to be made into a regional hospital. It became affiliated with the Collaborative Project to Increase Rural Doctors (CPIRD) program with Chiang Mai University on 10 May 2000.

See also 

Healthcare in Thailand
 Hospitals in Thailand
 List of hospitals in Thailand

References 
This article incorporates material from the corresponding article in the Thai Wikipedia.

Hospitals in Thailand
Lampang province